Mamponteng is a small town and is the capital of Kwabre, a district in the Ashanti Region of Ghana.

References

Mamponteng is a town located 12 miles North East of Kumasi. The town is widely known for its Municipal Hospital and currently a Senior High school; "Our Lady Of Grace Senior High School" refurbished with state of the Art learning materials and infrastructures making it one of the most beautiful and high standard institutions of study in the Ashanti Region.

It has over 7000 inhabitants and is the centre for most trading activities in the Afigya Kwabre Municipality 

Populated places in the Ashanti Region